The 1919 Paris–Roubaix was the 20th edition of the Paris–Roubaix, a classic one-day cycle race in France. The single day event was held on 20 April 1919 and stretched  from Paris to its end in a velodrome in Roubaix. The winner was Henri Pélissier from France.

Results

References

Paris–Roubaix
Paris–Roubaix
Paris–Roubaix
Paris–Roubaix